The Love Game is a 1960 French comedy film directed by Philippe de Broca. It was entered into the 10th Berlin International Film Festival where it won the Silver Bear Extraordinary Jury Prize.

The film's distributor threatened to seek an injunction against the U.S. Commissioner of Customs, who delayed granting clearance for The Love Game to be exhibited in the United States.

Plot
Suzanne wants to marry Victor and have children with him. Victor on the other hand isn't interested in becoming a husband or a father. While he cannot be bothered into complying with her wishes, their mutual friend Francois would be happy to do so. Consequently, Suzanne eventually turns to Francois. This leaves Victor no other choice than to change his mind if he wants Suzanne back.

Cast
 Jean-Pierre Cassel as Victor
 Geneviève Cluny as Suzanne
 Jean-Louis Maury as François
 Robert Vattier as L'acheteur galant
 Claude Cerval as Le consommateur
 Pierre Repp as L'automobiliste
 Maria Pacôme as Une cliente
 Jeanne Pérez as Le buraliste
 François Maistre as L'homme élégant
 Lud Germain as Le noir
 Claude Chabrol as Le forain
 Jackie Sardou

References

External links

1960 films
1960 romantic comedy films
French black-and-white films
French romantic comedy films
1960s French-language films
Films directed by Philippe de Broca
Films scored by Georges Delerue
1960s French films